Graphium rigidum is a species of fungus in the family Microascaceae. It is a plant pathogen. The fungus was originally described as new to science in 1794 by Christiaan Hendrik Persoon, as Stilbum rigidum. Pier Andrea Saccardo transferred it to the genus Graphium in 1886.

References

Fungal plant pathogens and diseases
Microascales
Fungi described in 1794
Taxa named by Christiaan Hendrik Persoon